Caramanico Terme is a comune and town in the province of Pescara in the Abruzzo region of Italy, situated near the confluence of the Orfento and Orta rivers, on a hilltop between the Monte Morrone and the Majella mountains.

History

The town takes its name from  cara, meaning rock and/or  arimannia, a Lombard establishment in the late Middle Ages. Then the name Terme was added in 1960 because of the presence of a spa nearby.

The present settlement is recorded since Lombard times. Then it underwent a remarkable development in the 14th-15th centuries, under the D'Aquino family, and in that period many important monuments were built. In 1706, an earthquake nearby destroyed the town.

Main sights

 Church of S. Maria Maggiore (15th century), with a Gothic exterior and an ogival portal with a depiction of the Coronation of the Virgin (1476). The exterior has also depictions of apostles, pilgrims and singers with 15th century musical instruments. The Assumption Chapel (17th century) has a Baroque interior.
 Romanesque church of St. Tommaso, founded in the 13th century in honor of Thomas of Canterbury. It was built above a 9th-century pieve. It has a nave and two aisles, with different levels. The façade has a rose window and single mullioned windows, three portals and four semi-colons from a never built portico. The side portals have with floreal decorations, while the central one has a high-relief of the Twelve Apostles and Christ Enthroned (1118). The interior, with a nave and aisles divided by composite columns (right) and square columns (left). The interior houses also a Corinthian column (known as Colonna santa) which has alleged miraculous properties.
Archaeological Museum "P. Barrasso"
Museum of Abruzzo and Italy Fauna
Hermitage of San Giovanni all'Orfento

References

External links

Photo Gallery 

 
Spa towns in Italy